The Southern Cross or Crux is a star group visible mainly in the Southern Hemisphere. It has been known by this English term since the late 18th century.

Southern Cross may also refer to:

Arts, entertainment and media

Music 
 "Southern Cross" (folk song), a Newfoundland folk ballad
 "Southern Cross" (Crosby, Stills and Nash song) (1982)
 "Southern Cross", a 1993 song by 808 State from Gorgeous
 "Southern Cross", a 1975 song by the Ozark Mountain Daredevils from The Car Over the Lake Album
 "Visions (Southern Cross)", a song by Stratovarius from Visions
 "Southern Cross", a song by Jason Webley from Counterpoint
 “The Sign of the Southern Cross”, a 1981 song by Black Sabbath

Newspapers 
 The Southern Cross (Argentina), an Argentine newspaper
 The Southern Cross (South Africa), a South African national Catholic weekly newspaper
 The Southern Cross (South Australia), a Catholic newspaper

Television 
 Seven Regional, formerly Southern Cross Television, an Australian television network
 10 Regional, formerly Southern Cross Ten, an Australian television channel
 "Southern Cross", an  episode of Robotech

Other uses in arts, entertainment and media
 Southern Cross (novel), a 1998 novel by Patricia Cornwell
 Southern Cross (wordless novel), a 1951 wordless novel by Laurence Hyde
 Gryphus 1 or the Southern Cross, a character in Ace Combat X: Skies of Deception
 The Southern Cross, a fictional organization in Inferno Cop

Businesses and organisations

Businesses
 Southern Cross Broadcasting, a broadcasting company in Australia
Southern Cross Austereo, an Australian media company 
 Southern Cross Healthcare (United Kingdom), a former operator of rest and care homes
 Southern Cross Healthcare Group (New Zealand), a health insurance and hospital operator
 Southern Cross Telco, a telecommunications company in Australia

Education 
 Southern Cross Campus, a composite school in Auckland, New Zealand
 Southern Cross College, a former name of Alphacrucis, a Christian college in Chester Hill, New South Wales, Australia
 Southern Cross University, in Lismore, New South Wales, Australia
 Southern Cross School, a K-12 school in Ballina, New South Wales, Australia

Heraldry 

 Order of the Southern Cross, a Brazilian order of knighthood
 Eureka Flag or Southern Cross
 Southern Cross or Confederate flag, a flag of the Confederate States of America

Places 
 Southern Cross, Queensland, a locality in the Charters Towers Region, Australia
 Southern Cross, Victoria, a locality in Victoria, Australia
 Southern Cross, Western Australia, a town in Western Australia

Transportation

Ships 
 MS Southern Cross, a cruise ship
 Southern Cross (Melanesian Mission ship series)
 Southern Cross (1891 Melanesian Mission ship)
 Southern Cross (yacht), a yacht that challenged for the 1974 America's Cup
 SS Southern Cross, a list of steamships
 Southern Cross, steam yacht ex-Rover in the 1930s, when owned by Howard Hughes

Other transportation
 Southern Cross (automobile), an Australian automobile manufactured from 1931 to 1935
 Southern Cross (aircraft), the Fokker F.VIIB/3m flown by Sir Charles Kingsford Smith
 Southern Cross railway station, Melbourne, Australia
 Southern Cross railway station, Western Australia
 Southern Cross Route, a flight route between Australasia and Europe through the Americas

Other uses 
 Southern Cross Cable, a submarine communications cable
 Southern Cross Group, an Australian conservation organisation
 Xanthosia rotundifolia, a plant species of Southwest Australia

See also
 Berlin Südkreuz ('South Cross Berlin')
 Exercise Croix du Sud, a military exercise in New Caledonia
 Flags depicting the Southern Cross
 Personal Ordinariate of Our Lady of the Southern Cross
 Southern Cross of Honor
 Southern Cross 28, an American yacht design
 Super Dimension Cavalry Southern Cross, a 1984 anime series from Japan brought to the US as part of Robotech
 Southern Cross Expedition 1898–1900, an expedition to Antarctica led by Carsten Borchgrevink
 Southern Cross News, the name of several news broadcasts